The Light Beyond the Forest: The Quest for the Holy Grail is the second book in Rosemary Sutcliff's Arthurian trilogy. While the previous book, The Sword and the Circle, is a collection of Arthurian tales including the creation of the Round Table, Sir Gawain and the Green Knight, and Beaumains the Kitchen Knight, this book focuses on the search for the Holy Grail, cutting back and forth between the quests of Lancelot, Bors, Percival, and Galahad.

The trilogy continues with The Road to Camlann.

References

External links
 Official website with more on book and author

1979 British novels
Novels by Rosemary Sutcliff
British children's novels
Modern Arthurian fiction
Novels set in the 6th century
1979 children's books
Holy Grail in fiction
The Bodley Head books